HLA-B60 (B60) is an HLA - B serotype. B60 is a split antigen serotype that recognizes certain B40 serotypes.

Serotype

References

6